American vocalist Frank Sinatra recorded 59 studio albums and 297 singles in his solo career, spanning 54 years. Sinatra signed with Columbia Records in 1943; his debut album The Voice of Frank Sinatra was released in 1946. Sinatra would achieve greater success with Capitol and Reprise Records, the former of which he released his final two albums on—Duets and Duets II. Eight compilation albums under Sinatra's name were released in his lifetime, with more albums released following his death in 1998.

Albums

Studio albums
Columbia Records introduced the LP album on June 21, 1948; prior to that albums were collections of 78s in a booklet resembling a photo album, rarely more than four records to a set. Sinatra's Capitol studio albums were released on Concepts in 1992, and the bulk of his Capitol recordings released on the 1998 album The Capitol Years.

1940s/50s

1960s

1970s/80s

1990s

Notes

Compilation albums

Live albums

Albums conducted by Sinatra

Box sets and collections

RCA Records
 1944 Starmaker (Sinatra/Dorsey)
 1954 Fabulous Frankie (Sinatra/Dorsey)
 1957 Frankie and Tommy (Sinatra/Dorsey)
 1958 We 3 (Sinatra/Dorsey/Stordahl)
 1988 All Time Greatest Hits, Vols. 1-4 (Sinatra/Dorsey)
 1994 The Song Is You (Sinatra/Dorsey) [5-Disc]
 1996 Frank Sinatra & Tommy Dorsey - Greatest Hits
 1998 Frank Sinatra & the Tommy Dorsey Orchestra [3-Disc]
 2005 The Essential Frank Sinatra with the Tommy Dorsey Orchestra [2-Disc]

Columbia Records
 1953 Get Happy!
 1955 Frankie
 1955 The Voice
 1956 That Old Feeling
 1957 Adventures of the Heart
 1957 Christmas Dreaming
 1958 Love Is a Kick
 1958 The Broadway Kick
 1958 Put Your Dreams Away
 1958 The Frank Sinatra Story in Music (No. 12 U.S. Billboard, 1 week)
 1959 Come Back to Sorrento
 1966 Greatest Hits: The Early Years
 1966 Greatest Hits: The Early Years Volume Two
 1968 Someone to Watch Over Me
 1968 In Hollywood 1943-1949
 1972 In The Beginning: 1943 To 1951 [2-LP]
 1986 The Voice: The Columbia Years (1943-1952) [6-LP]
 1987 Hello Young Lovers
 1988 Sinatra Rarities: The Columbia Years
 1993 The Columbia Years 1943-1952: The Complete Recordings [12-Disc]
 1994 The Columbia Years 1943–1952: The V-Discs [2-Disc]
 1994 The Essence of Frank Sinatra
 1995 16 Most Requested Songs
 1995 The Complete Recordings Nineteen Thirty-Nine (Harry James & His Orchestra featuring Frank Sinatra)
 1995 I've Got a Crush on You
 1996 Sinatra Sings Rodgers and Hammerstein
 1997 Frank Sinatra Sings His Greatest Hits
 1997 Portrait of Sinatra: Columbia Classics [2-Disc]
 1998 The Best of the Columbia Years: 1943-1952 [4-Disc]
 2000 Super Hits
 2001 Love Songs
 2003 The Essential Frank Sinatra: The Columbia Years
 2003 The Real Complete Columbia Years V-Discs [3-Disc]
 2003 Sinatra Sings Cole Porter
 2003 Sinatra Sings George Gershwin
 2007 A Voice in Time: 1939-1952 [4-Disc]
 2009 From the Heart
 2015 A Voice on Air 1935-1955 [4 Disc]

Capitol Records
 1954 Songs for Young Lovers
 1954 Swing Easy!
 1955 In the Wee Small Hours
 1956 Songs for Swingin' Lovers!
 1956 This Is Sinatra!
 1957 Close to You And More
 1957 A Swingin' Affair!
 1957 Where Are You?
 1957 A Jolly Christmas from Frank Sinatra
 1958 This Is Sinatra Volume 2
 1958 Come Fly with Me
 1958 Frank Sinatra Sings For Only The Lonely
 1959 Look to Your Heart
 1959 Come Dance with Me!
 1959 No One Cares
 1960 Nice 'n' Easy
 1961 Sinatra's Swingin' Session!!!
 1961 Come Swing with Me!
 1961 Look Over Your Shoulder
 1961 All the Way
 1962 Point of No Return
 1962 Sinatra Sings...of Love and Things
 1962 The Great Years [3-LP]
 1963 Sinatra Sings the Select Johnny Mercer
 1963 Sings Rodgers and Hart
 1963 Tell Her You Love Her (U.S. Billboard No. 129, 4 weeks)
 1964 The Great Hits of Frank Sinatra
 1965 Sings the Select Cole Porter
 1966 Forever Frank
 1967 Nevertheless I'm in Love With You
 1967 Songs for the Young at Heart
 1967 The Nearness of You
 1967 Try a Little Tenderness
 1967 September Song
 1968 The Best Of Frank Sinatra
 1968 The Sinatra Touch [6-LP]
 1972 The Cole Porter Songbook
 1972 The Great Years [3-LP]
 1974 One More for the Road
 1974 Round # 1 (No. 170 U.S. Billboard, 3 weeks, January 1975)
 1987 The Frank Sinatra Collection (BPI: Silver)
 1988 Screen Sinatra
 1989 The Capitol Collectors Series
 1990 The Capitol Years [3-Disc] (No. 126, 11 weeks U.S. Billboard)
 1992 Concepts [16-Disc]
 1992 The Best of the Capitol Years
 1995 Sinatra 80th: All the Best [2-Disc] (No. 66, 5 weeks U.S. Billboard, BPI: Silver)
 1996 The Complete Capitol Singles Collection [4-Disc]
 1998 The Capitol Years [21-Disc, UK]
 2000 Classic Sinatra: His Greatest Performances 1953-1960 (BPI: Gold)
 2002 Classic Duets
 2004 The Platinum Collection [3-Disc] (BPI: Silver)
 2007 Romance: Songs From the Heart
 2008 Sinatra at the Movies
 2008 The Heart of the Matter (Starbucks)
 2009 Classic Sinatra II
 2011 Sinatra: Best of the Best (BPI: Gold)
 2015 Ultimate Sinatra (BPI: Gold)

Reprise Records
 1963 The Concert Sinatra
 1964 It Might as Well Be Swing
 1965 Sinatra '65: The Singer Today
 1965 A Man and His Music
 1965 My Kind of Broadway (U.S. Billboard No. 30, 16 weeks)
 1965 September of My Years
 1966 A Man and His Music (Part II): The Frank Sinatra CBS Television Special
 1967 Francis Albert Sinatra & Antonio Carlos Jobim
 1968 Frank Sinatra's Greatest Hits
 1972 Frank Sinatra's Greatest Hits, Vol. 2
 1973 Frank [2LP] cat.no.: K64016
 1975 Best of Ol' Blue Eyes (BPI: Silver)
 1977 Portrait of Sinatra - Forty Songs from the Life of a Man (UK No. 1, BPI: Platinum)
 1979 Sinatra-Jobim Sessions
 1990 The Reprise Collection [4-Disc] (No. 98, 10 weeks U.S. Billboard)
 1991 Sinatra Reprise: The Very Good Years (No. 138, 27 weeks U.S. Billboard)
 1992 Sinatra: Soundtrack To The CBS Mini-Series [2-Disc]
 1994 The Sinatra Christmas Album
 1995 The Complete Reprise Studio Recordings [20-Disc]
 1996 Everything Happens to Me
 1997 The Very Best of Frank Sinatra [2-Disc] (No. 124, 2 weeks U.S. Billboard)
 1997 My Way: The Best of Frank Sinatra [2-Disc] (BPI: 5× Platinum)
 1998 Lucky Numbers
 2000 Reprise Musical Repertory Theatre  [4-Disc]
 2002 Frank Sinatra in Hollywood 1940-1964
 2002 Greatest Love Songs (No. 32, 16 weeks, U.S. Billboard)
 2004 Frank Sinatra Christmas Collection
 2004 Romance
 2008 Nothing but the Best (BPI: Gold)
 2010 The Reprise Years [36-Disc]

LaserLight
 1995 Christmas Through the Years

Rhino Records
 2009 Seduction: Sinatra Sings of Love [2-Disc]

Star Mark Compilations
 2008 Frank Sinatra's Greatest Hits

Starlite
 1993 Frank Sinatra, Dean Martin, Sammy Davis Jr: Rat Pack is Back

Tribute albums to Sinatra 
A Jazz Portrait of Frank Sinatra by Oscar Peterson (1959)
Very Sinatra by Ruby Braff (1981)
Perfectly Frank by Tony Bennett (1992)
Voices in Standard by The Four Freshmen (1994)
As I Remember It by Frank Sinatra, Jr. (1996)
Manilow Sings Sinatra by Barry Manilow (1998)
Sinatraland by Patrick Williams and His Big Band (1998)
Blue Eyes Plays Ol' Blue Eyes by Si Zentner & Orchestra (1998)
Keely Sings Sinatra by Keely Smith (2001)
Michael Andrew Pays Tribute to Frank Sinatra by Michael Andrew (2002)
Steve Lawrence Sings Sinatra by Steve Lawrence (2003)
Plays Sinatra His Way by Joey DeFrancesco (2004)
Allow Us to Be Frank by Westlife (2004)
Songs of Sinatra by Steve Tyrell (2005)
Blue Eyes Meets Bed-Stuy The Notorious B.I.G. & Frank Sinatra by Jon Moskowitz and Dj Cappel & Smitty (2005)
L'allieva by Mina (2005)
Bolton Swings Sinatra by Michael Bolton (2006)
Dear Mr. Sinatra by John Pizzarelli (2006)
Ray Stevens Sings Sinatra...Say What?? by Ray Stevens (2008)
His Way, Our Way by various artists (2009)
Cauby Sings Sinatra by Cauby Peixoto (2010)
Sin-Atra a heavy metal tribute by various artists (2011)
Let's Be Frank by Trisha Yearwood (2018)

Singles
Singles are listed with B-side immediately succeeding. Where a song is listed as (by X), or (instrumental), Sinatra does not feature. (US) Number indicates highest chart position on combined Billboard charts. The chart positions before "Mr. Success" are Pre-Billboard Hot 100.

With the Tommy Dorsey Orchestra (RCA Victor) (1940–1942)

First solo singles (Bluebird Records) (1942)

Columbia singles (1943–1952)

All Orchestras conducted by Axel Stordahl, unless otherwise noted

Capitol singles (1953–1962)
Sinatra's Capitol singles were released on The Complete Capitol Singles Collection (1996). UK Singles Chart positions from 1952 onwards.

Reprise singles (1961–1983)
Sinatra's Reprise singles were released as part of The Complete Reprise Studio Recordings (1995)

Qwest singles (1984)
Sinatra's Qwest singles were released as part of The Complete Reprise Studio Recordings (1995), and originally appeared on L.A. Is My Lady (1984).

Island singles (1993)

Holiday 100 chart entries
Since many radio stations in the US adopt a format change to Christmas music each December, many holiday hits have an annual spike in popularity during the last few weeks of the year and are retired once the season is over. In December 2011, Billboard began a Holiday Songs chart with 50 positions that monitors the last five weeks of each year to "rank the top holiday hits of all eras using the same methodology as the Hot 100, blending streaming, airplay, and sales data", and in 2013 the number of positions on the chart was doubled, resulting in the Holiday 100. A handful of Sinatra recordings have made appearances on the Holiday 100 and are noted below according to the holiday season in which they charted there.

Videography
This is a list of programs featuring Frank Sinatra that are officially sanctioned by the Sinatra estate. Most releases consist of videotaped television specials or live concerts. All titles listed have been released on DVD separately and collectively in various countries, most are also on VHS and some on LaserDisc.
The Frank Sinatra Show (ABC, 1957–58) – at least 11 of 32 episodes released
The Frank Sinatra Timex Show: "Bing Crosby and Dean Martin Present High Hopes" (1959, 59 minutes)
The Frank Sinatra Timex Show: "An Afternoon with Frank Sinatra" aka The Frank Sinatra Show with Ella Fitzgerald (1959, 59 minutes)
The Frank Sinatra Timex Show: Here's to the Ladies (1960, 59 minutes)
The Frank Sinatra Timex Show: It's Nice to Go Traveling aka Welcome Home Elvis (1960, 59 minutes)
The Royal Festival Hall aka This is Sinatra! and Sinatra Command Performance (1962, 93 minutes)
Frank Sinatra Spectacular – only known filmed 1960s concert by the Rat Pack, Kiel Opera House, St. Louis, MO, June 20, 1965; 90 minutes)
Frank Sinatra: A Man and His Music (1965, 51 minutes)
A Man and His Music Part II (1966, 51 minutes)
A Man and His Music + Ella + Jobim (1967, 52 minutes)
Francis Albert Sinatra Does His Thing (1968, 52 minutes)
Sinatra (1969, 52 minutes)
Sinatra in Concert (1970, 51 minutes)
Sinatra and Friends (1977, 50 minutes)
Magnavox Presents Frank Sinatra aka Ol' Blue Eyes Is Back (1973, 51 minutes)
Sinatra: The Main Event (1974, 53 minutes)
Live from Caesars Palace (1978, 74 minutes)
Live at Carnegie Hall (1980, 74 minutes)
The Man and His Music (1981, 49 minutes)
Concert for the Americas (1982, 86 minutes)
Portrait of an Album (1985, 59 minutes)
Sinatra in Japan (1985, 71 minutes)
Sinatra Sings (2011, 58 minutes) – documentary narrated by Tina Sinatra
Sinatra: All or Nothing at All (2015, 259 minutes) – documentary including Sinatra's three children and their mother

See also
List of songs recorded by Frank Sinatra
Frank Sinatra's recorded legacy
List of awards and nominations received by Frank Sinatra

References

External links
Sinatra.com
 

Discographies of American artists
Vocal jazz discographies
Discography